Iván Hompanera (born 26 January 1969 in Barcelona) is a paralympic athlete from Spain competing mainly in category T36 middle distance events.

Hompanera competed in two Paralympics in 2000 and 2004.  In 2000 he won gold in both of his events the T36 800m and the T38 5000m.  While not defending his 5000m title in 2004 he did run the 800m but was unable to medal on that occasion, he also took part in the Spanish 4 × 400 m relay team that also failed to metal.

Curriculum Deportivo:

- 1990 – 1994. 2005.  Centro de Alto Rendimiento (CAR) San Cugat.

- 1999. Campeón del mundo 800ml.  4 x 400ml (Can Drago) Barcelona.

- 2000. Campeón Paralímpico 800ml. 5000ml. (Sydney) Australia.

- 2002. Subcampeón del mundo 800ml. (Lille) Francia.

- 2003. Campeón de Europa  4 x 400ml., 800ml., 5000ml. (Assen) Holanda.

- 2004. 5º en 800ml. 4º en  4 x 400ml. Paralimpiada de Athenas (Grecia).

- 2005. 3º de Europa en 800ml. (Espoo) Finlandia.

- 1999 – 2002. 3 veces Campeón del Mundo de Cross (Vilamoura) Portugal.

- 2003. Campeón del Mundo de Cross (Albufeira) Portugal.

- 2011.   Campeón de España Duatlón TRI3. Soria

-2011.    Campeón del Mundo Triatlón Cross TRI3. Cáceres

-Récords  del Mundo:

- 3.000ml  Basauri 2001 (9´13”)

- 5.000ml  Hospitalet 2008 (15´55”26)

- Media Maratón  Sitges 2000 (1h 07´49”)

- Maratón  Valencia 2000 (2h 32´34”)

- Record de Europa 1500ml  Manhein 2003 (4´12”)

- Marcas Personales:

- 3000 ml 8´14” (Cornellá 1990)

- 5000ml  14´03”20 (Palafrugell 1992)

- 1000ml  28´58”47 (Baracaldo 1992)

- Media Marathon 1h 07”49 (Sitges 2000)

- Marathon 2h 32”34 (Valencia 2000)

References

Paralympic athletes of Spain
Athletes (track and field) at the 2000 Summer Paralympics
Athletes (track and field) at the 2004 Summer Paralympics
Paralympic gold medalists for Spain
Living people
Medalists at the 2000 Summer Paralympics
1969 births
Paralympic medalists in athletics (track and field)
Spanish male middle-distance runners